Robert Edward Burgess (26 March 1949) is a New Zealand rugby union player. A first five-eighth, Burgess represented Manawatu at a provincial level, and was a member of the New Zealand national side, the All Blacks, from 1971 to 1973. He played 30 matches for the All Blacks including seven internationals. In 1970 Burgess refused nomination for the All Black trials for the tour of South Africa as a protest against that country's apartheid regime, and in 1981 he actively campaigned against the 1981 South African tour of New Zealand.

At the 1998 local-body elections, Burgess stood for the Palmerston North mayoralty, finishing fourth in a field of 15 candidates. He is married to New Zealand writer Linda Burgess.

References

1949 births
Living people
Rugby union players from New Plymouth
People educated at Palmerston North Boys' High School
People educated at Hastings Boys' High School
New Zealand rugby union players
New Zealand international rugby union players
Manawatu rugby union players
Lyon OU players
New Zealand expatriate sportspeople in France
Expatriate rugby union players in France
New Zealand expatriate rugby union players
Rugby union fly-halves
Anti-apartheid activists